Huang Chu-wen (born 20 August 1941) is a Taiwanese politician. He was the  Minister of the Interior from 1998 to 2000.

References

Taiwanese Ministers of the Interior
Living people
1941 births
National Taiwan University alumni
Taiwan Solidarity Union chairpersons
Kuomintang Members of the Legislative Yuan in Taiwan
Members of the 1st Legislative Yuan in Taiwan
Members of the 2nd Legislative Yuan
Members of the 3rd Legislative Yuan